Miguel Goñi Gallego (born 10 March 1998) is a Spanish professional footballer who plays as a central defender for CD Laredo, on loan from Racing de Santander.

Club career
Goñi was born in Santander, Cantabria, and joined Racing de Santander's youth setup in 2008 at the age of ten, from Club Bansander. He made his senior debut with the reserves during the 2016–17 season, in Tercera División.

Goñi made his first team debut on 11 July 2020, coming on as a late substitute for Nando García in a 1–0 Segunda División home win against SD Huesca. On 28 September, he was loaned to Segunda División B side CD Laredo for the season.

Personal life
Goñi's twin brother Pablo is also a footballer. A forward, he too was groomed at Racing.

References

External links

1997 births
Living people
Spanish twins
Twin sportspeople
Spanish footballers
Footballers from Santander, Spain
Association football defenders
Segunda División players
Segunda División B players
Tercera División players
Rayo Cantabria players
Racing de Santander players